Steffi Graf was the defending champion but did not compete that year.

Conchita Martínez won in the final 6–2, 6–0 against Lisa Raymond.

Seeds
A champion seed is indicated in bold text while text in italics indicates the round in which that seed was eliminated. All eighteen seeds received a bye to the second round.

  Arantxa Sánchez Vicario (third round)
  Conchita Martínez (champion)
  Mary Pierce (semifinals)
 n/a
 n/a
  Natasha Zvereva (second round)
  Nathalie Tauziat (second round)
  Chanda Rubin (second round)
  Lisa Raymond (final)
  Amanda Coetzer (second round)
  Marianne Werdel-Witmeyer (quarterfinals)
 n/a
  Elena Likhovtseva (second round)
  Angélica Gavaldón (second round)
  Joannette Kruger (third round)
  Gigi Fernández (quarterfinals)
  Tami Whitlinger-Jones (second round)
  Christina Singer (third round)

Draw

Finals

Top half

Section 1

Section 2

Bottom half

Section 3

Section 4

External links
 1995 Toshiba Classic draw

Southern California Open
1995 WTA Tour